This is a list of members of the 16th Bundestag – the lower house of parliament of the Federal Republic of Germany, whose members were in office from 18 October 2005 until 27 October 2009.



Summary 
This summary includes changes in the numbers of the five caucuses (CDU/CSU, SPD, FDP, The Left, Greens):

Members

A
Jens Ackermann, FDP
Ulrich Adam, CDU
Karl Addicks, FDP
Christian Ahrendt, FDP
Ilse Aigner, CSU
Lale Akgün, SPD
Peter Albach, CDU
Peter Altmaier, CDU
Gregor Amann, SPD
Kerstin Andreae, Bündnis 90/Die Grünen
Gerd Andres, SPD
Niels Annen, SPD
Ingrid Arndt-Brauer, SPD
Rainer Arnold, SPD
Hüseyin Kenan Aydın, Die Linke.

B
Sabine Bätzing, SPD
Daniel Bahr, FDP
Ernst Bahr, SPD
Thomas Bareiß, CDU
Doris Barnett, SPD
Hans-Peter Bartels, SPD
Uwe Barth, FDP
Klaus Barthel, SPD
Norbert Barthle, CDU
Sören Bartol, SPD
Dietmar Bartsch, Die Linke.
Wolf Bauer, CDU
Günter Baumann, CDU
Ernst-Reinhard Beck, CDU
Marieluise Beck, Bündnis 90/Die Grünen
Volker Beck, Bündnis 90/Die Grünen
Dirk Becker, SPD
Uwe Beckmeyer, SPD
Cornelia Behm, Bündnis 90/Die Grünen
Veronika Maria Bellmann, CDU
Birgitt Bender, Bündnis 90/Die Grünen
Klaus Uwe Benneter, SPD
Axel Berg, SPD
Ute Berg, SPD
Christoph Bergner, CDU
Otto Bernhardt, CDU
Matthias Berninger, Bündnis 90/Die Grünen
Petra Bierwirth, SPD
Karin Binder, Die Linke.
Lothar Binding, SPD
Clemens Binninger, CDU
Lothar Bisky, Die Linke.
Carl-Eduard Graf von Bismarck, CDU
Renate Blank, CSU
Peter Bleser, CDU
Heidrun Bluhm, Die Linke.
Antje Blumenthal, CDU
Volker Blumentritt, SPD
Kurt Bodewig, SPD
Maria Böhmer, CDU
Wolfgang Börnsen, CDU
Clemens Bollen, SPD
Gerd Bollmann, SPD
Alexander Bonde, Bündnis 90/Die Grünen
Jochen Borchert, CDU
Wolfgang Bosbach, CDU
Gerhard Botz, SPD
Klaus Brähmig, CDU
Michael Brand, CDU
Klaus Brandner, SPD
Helmut Brandt, CDU
Willi Brase, SPD
Ralf Brauksiepe, CDU
Bernhard Brinkmann, SPD
Rainer Brüderle, FDP
Monika Brüning, CDU
Angelika Brunkhorst, FDP
Georg Brunnhuber, CDU
Marco Bülow, SPD
Michael Bürsch, SPD
Eva Bulling-Schröter, Die Linke.
Edelgard Bulmahn, SPD
Martina Bunge, Die Linke.
Ulla Burchardt, SPD
Ernst Burgbacher, FDP
Martin Burkert, SPD

C
Christian Carstensen, SPD
Marion Caspers-Merk, SPD
Roland Claus, Die Linke.
Gitta Connemann, CDU

D
Herta Däubler-Gmelin, SPD
Sevim Dağdelen, Die Linke.
Peter Danckert, SPD
Leo Dautzenberg, CDU
Diether Dehm, Die Linke.
Hubert Deittert, CDU
Ekin Deligöz, Bündnis 90/Die Grünen
Karl Diller, SPD
Alexander Dobrindt, CSU
Thomas Dörflinger, CDU
Patrick Döring, FDP
Martin Dörmann, SPD
Marie-Luise Dött, CDU
Werner Dreibus, Die Linke.
Carl-Christian Dressel, SPD
Elvira Drobinski-Weiß, SPD
Thea Dückert, Bündnis 90/Die Grünen
Garrelt Duin, SPD
Mechthild Dyckmans, FDP
Detlef Dzembritzki, SPD

E
Sebastian Edathy, SPD
Siegmund Ehrmann, SPD
Hans Eichel, SPD
Maria Eichhorn, CSU
Ursula Eid, Bündnis 90/Die Grünen
Dagmar Enkelmann, Die Linke.
Gernot Erler, SPD
Klaus Ernst, Die Linke.
Petra Ernstberger, SPD
Jörg van Essen, FDP
Karin Evers-Meyer, SPD
Anke Eymer, CDU

F
Georg Fahrenschon, CSU
Ilse Falk, CDU
Annette Faße, SPD
Hans Georg Faust, CDU
Hans-Josef Fell, Bündnis 90/Die Grünen
Enak Ferlemann, CDU
Elke Ferner, SPD
Ingrid Fischbach, CDU
Axel Fischer, CDU
Dirk Fischer, CDU
Hartwig Fischer, CDU
Joseph "Joschka" Fischer, Bündnis 90/Die Grünen
Ulrike Flach, FDP
Maria Franziska Flachsbarth, CDU
Klaus-Peter Flosbach, CDU
Gabriele Fograscher, SPD
Rainer Fornahl, SPD
Herbert Frankenhauser, CSU
Gabriele Frechen, SPD
Dagmar Freitag, SPD
Otto Fricke, FDP
Paul Klemens Friedhoff, FDP
Hans-Peter Friedrich, CSU
 Horst Friedrich, FDP
Peter Friedrich, SPD
Erich G. Fritz, CDU
Jochen-Konrad Fromme, CDU
Michael Fuchs, CDU
Hans-Joachim Fuchtel, CDU

G
Sigmar Gabriel, SPD
Peter Gauweiler, CSU
Jürgen Gehb, CDU
Wolfgang Gehrcke-Reymann, Die Linke.
Kai Boris Gehring, Bündnis 90/Die Grünen
Norbert Geis, CSU
Edmund Peter Geisen, FDP
Wolfgang Gerhardt, FDP
Martin Gerster, SPD
Eberhard Gienger, CDU
Iris Gleicke, SPD
Michael Glos, CSU
Günter Gloser, SPD
Ralf Göbel, CDU
Reinhard Göhner, CDU
Josef Göppel, CSU
Katrin Göring-Eckardt, Bündnis 90/Die Grünen
Peter Götz, CDU
Wolfgang Götzer, CSU
Hans-Michael Goldmann, FDP
Diana Golze, Die Linke.
Renate Gradistanac, SPD
Angelika Graf, SPD
Ute Granold, CDU
Dieter Grasedieck, SPD
Monika Griefahn, SPD
Kerstin Griese, SPD
Reinhard Grindel, CDU
Hermann Gröhe, CDU
Gabriele Groneberg, SPD
Michael Grosse-Brömer, CDU
Achim Großmann, SPD
Wolfgang Grotthaus, SPD
Markus Grübel, CDU
Monika Grütters, CDU
Manfred Grund, CDU
Miriam Gruß, FDP
Joachim Günther, FDP
Wolfgang Gunkel, SPD
Karl-Theodor Freiherr von und zu Guttenberg, CSU
Olav Gutting, CDU  
Dr.Gregor Gysi, Die Linke.

H
Hans-Joachim Hacker, SPD
Heike Hänsel, Die Linke.
Bettina Hagedorn, SPD
Klaus Hagemann, SPD
Holger-Heinrich Haibach, CDU
Anja Hajduk, Bündnis 90/Die Grünen
Christel Happach-Kasan, FDP
Alfred Hartenbach, SPD
Michael Hartmann, SPD
Gerda Hasselfeldt, CSU
Britta Haßelmann, Bündnis 90/Die Grünen
Nina Hauer, SPD
Heinz-Peter Haustein, FDP
Hubertus Heil, SPD
Lutz Eberhard Heilmann, Die Linke.
Ursula Heinen, CDU
Uda Carmen Freia Heller, CDU
Reinhold Hemker, SPD
Rolf Hempelmann, SPD
Barbara Hendricks, SPD
Michael Hennrich, CDU
Winfried Hermann, Bündnis 90/Die Grünen
Jürgen Herrmann, CDU
Gustav Herzog, SPD
Petra Heß, SPD
Peter Hettlich, Bündnis 90/Die Grünen
Bernd Reinhold Gerhard Heynemann, CDU
Hans-Kurt Hill, Die Linke.
Gabriele Hiller-Ohm, SPD
Stephan Hilsberg, SPD
Ernst Hinsken, CSU
Peter Hintze, CDU
Petra Hinz, SPD
Priska Hinz, Bündnis 90/Die Grünen
Cornelia Hirsch, Die Linke.
Robert Hochbaum, CDU
Gerd Höfer, SPD
Ulrike Höfken, Bündnis 90/Die Grünen
Inge Höger-Neuling, Die Linke.
Bärbel Höhn, Bündnis 90/Die Grünen
Barbara Höll, Die Linke.
Joachim Hörster, CDU
Klaus Hofbauer, CSU
Elke Hoff, FDP
Iris Hoffmann, SPD
Frank Hofmann, SPD
Anton Hofreiter, Bündnis 90/Die Grünen
Franz-Josef Holzenkamp, CDU
Birgit Homburger, FDP
Thilo Hoppe, Bündnis 90/Die Grünen
Eike Anna Maria Hovermann, SPD
Werner Hoyer, FDP
Anette Hübinger, CDU
Klaas Hübner, SPD
Hubert Hüppe, CDU
Steffen Hultsch, Die Linke.
Christel Humme, SPD

I
Lothar Ibrügger, SPD
Brunhilde Irber, SPD

J
Susanne Jaffke, CDU
Dieter Peter Jahr, CDU
Ulla Jelpke, Die Linke.
Lukrezia Jochimsen, Die Linke.
Hans-Heinrich Jordan, CDU
Andreas Jung, CDU
Franz Josef Jung, CDU
Johannes Jung, SPD
Josip Juratovic, SPD

K
Johannes Kahrs, SPD
Bartholomäus Kalb, CSU
Hans-Werner Kammer, CDU
Steffen Kampeter, CDU
Alois Karl, CSU
Ulrich Kasparick, SPD
Bernhard Kaster, CDU
Susanne Kastner, SPD
Michael Kauch, FDP
Siegfried Kauder, CDU
Volker Kauder, CDU
Ulrich Kelber, SPD
Hakkı Keskin, Die Linke.
Katja Kipping, Die Linke.
Eckart von Klaeden, CDU
Christian Kleiminger, SPD
Jürgen Klimke, CDU
Julia Klöckner, CDU
Hans-Ulrich Klose, SPD
Astrid Klug, SPD
Monika Knoche, Die Linke.
Ute Koczy, Bündnis 90/Die Grünen
Kristina Köhler, CDU
Hellmut Königshaus, FDP
Norbert Königshofen, CDU
Jens Koeppen, CDU
Fritz-Rudolf Körper, SPD
Bärbel Kofler, SPD
Heinrich Leonhard Kolb, FDP
Manfred Kolbe, CDU
Walter Kolbow, SPD
Gudrun Kopp, FDP
Jürgen Koppelin, FDP
Jan Korte, Die Linke.
Karin Kortmann, SPD
Rolf Koschorrek, CDU
Hartmut Koschyk, CSU
Thomas Kossendey, CDU
Sylvia Kotting-Uhl, Bündnis 90/Die Grünen
Rolf Kramer, SPD
Anette Kramme, SPD
Ernst Kranz, SPD
Nicolette Kressl, SPD
Michael Kretschmer, CDU
Gunther Krichbaum, CDU
Günter Krings, CDU
Volker Kröning, SPD
Martina Krogmann, CDU
Angelika Krüger-Leißner, SPD
Hans-Ulrich Krüger, SPD
Johann-Henrich Krummacher, CDU
Jürgen Kucharczyk, SPD
Helga Kühn-Mengel, SPD
Renate Künast, Bündnis 90/Die Grünen
Hermann Kues, CDU
Uwe Küster, SPD
Fritz Kuhn, Bündnis 90/Die Grünen
Ute Kumpf, SPD
Katrin Kunert, Die Linke.
Markus Kurth, Bündnis 90/Die Grünen
Patrick Kurth, FDP
Undine Kurth, Bündnis 90/Die Grünen

L
Andreas Lämmel, CDU
Oskar Lafontaine, Die Linke.
Christine Lambrecht, SPD
Karl A. Lamers, CDU
Norbert Lammert, CDU
Katharina Landgraf, CDU
Heinz Lanfermann, FDP
Christian Lange, SPD
Sibylle Laurischk, FDP
Karl Lauterbach, SPD
Monika Lazar, Bündnis 90/Die Grünen
Maximilian Lehmer, CSU
Waltraud Lehn, SPD
Paul Lehrieder, CSU
Harald Leibrecht, FDP
Ina Lenke, FDP
Michael Gerhard Leutert, Die Linke.
Sabine Leutheusser-Schnarrenberger, FDP
Ingbert Liebing, CDU
Michael Link, FDP
Eduard Lintner, CSU
Klaus Wilhelm Lippold, CDU
Patricia Lips, CDU
Markus Löning, FDP
Gabriele Lösekrug-Möller, SPD
Ursula Lötzer, Die Linke.
Gesine Lötzsch, Die Linke.
Helga Lopez, SPD
Reinhard Loske, Bündnis 90/Die Grünen
Anna Lührmann, Bündnis 90/Die Grünen
Michael Andreas Luther, CDU

M
Dorothee Mantel, CSU
Dirk Manzewski, SPD
Lothar Mark, SPD
Caren Marks, SPD
Katja Mast, SPD
Hildegard Mattheis, SPD
Ulrich Maurer, Die Linke.
Stephan Mayer, CSU
Johannes-Markus Meckel, SPD
Wolfgang Meckelburg, CDU
Horst Meierhofer, FDP
Patrick Meinhardt, FDP
Michael Meister, CDU
Dorothée Menzner, Die Linke.
Angela Merkel, CDU
Petra Merkel, SPD
Ulrike Merten, SPD
Friedrich Merz, CDU
Laurenz Meyer, CDU
Maria Ludwiga Michalk, CDU
Hans Michelbach, CSU
Matthias Miersch, SPD
Philipp Mißfelder, CDU
Kornelia Edeltraud Karin Möller, Die Linke.
Eva Möllring, CDU
Ursula Mogg, SPD
Jerzy Montag, Bündnis 90/Die Grünen
Marlene Mortler, CSU
Jan Mücke, FDP
Marko Mühlstein, SPD
Burkhardt Müller-Sönksen, FDP
Bernward Müller, CDU
Carsten Müller, CDU
Detlef Müller, SPD
Gerd Müller, CSU
Hildegard Müller, CDU
Kerstin Müller, Bündnis 90/Die Grünen
Michael Müller, SPD
Stefan Müller, CSU
Franz Müntefering, SPD
Rolf Mützenich, SPD
Gesine Multhaupt, SPD

N
Winfried Nachtwei, Bündnis 90/Die Grünen
Andrea Maria Nahles, SPD
Kersten Naumann, Die Linke.
Wolfgang-Dragie Willi Neskovic, Die Linke.
Bernd Neumann, CDU
Dirk Niebel, FDP
Henry Nitzsche, CDU
Michaela Noll, CDU
Georg Nüßlein, CSU

O
Franz Obermeier, CSU
Thomas Oppermann, SPD
Holger Ortel, SPD
Eduard Oswald, CSU
Henning Otte, CDU
Hans-Joachim Otto, FDP

P
Norman Paech, Die Linke.
Detlef Parr, FDP
Petra Pau, Die Linke.
Heinz Paula, SPD
Rita Pawelski, CDU
Peter Paul Paziorek, CDU
Ulrich Petzold, CDU
Joachim Pfeiffer, CDU
Sibylle Pfeiffer, CDU
Friedbert Pflüger, CDU
Johannes Pflug, SPD
Beatrix Philipp, CDU
Cornelia Pieper, FDP
Gisela Piltz, FDP
Ronald Pofalla, CDU
Ruprecht Polenz, CDU
Joachim Poß, SPD
Brigitte Pothmer, Bündnis 90/Die Grünen
Christoph Pries, SPD
Wilhelm Priesmeier, SPD
Florian Pronold, SPD

R
Daniela Raab, CSU
Sascha Raabe, SPD
Thomas Rachel, CDU
Hans Raidel, CSU
Bodo Ramelow, Die Linke.
Peter Ramsauer, CSU
Peter Harald Rauen, CDU
Mechthild Rawert, SPD
Eckhardt Rehberg, CDU
Katherina Reiche, CDU
Steffen Reiche, SPD
Maik Reichel, SPD
Gerold Reichenbach, SPD
Carola Reimann, SPD
Elke Reinke, Die Linke.
Klaus Riegert, CDU
Christel Riemann-Hanewinckel, SPD
Heinz Riesenhuber, CDU
Walter Riester, SPD
Sönke Rix, SPD
Johannes Röring, CDU
René Röspel, SPD
Norbert Röttgen, CDU
Jörg Rohde, FDP
Franz Romer, CDU
Kurt J. Rossmanith, CSU
Ernst-Dieter Rossmann, SPD
Claudia Roth, Bündnis 90/Die Grünen
Karin Roth, SPD
Michael Roth, SPD
Christian Ruck, CSU
Ortwin Runde, SPD
Albert Rupprecht, CSU
Marlene Dorothe Henriette Rupprecht, SPD
Peter Rzepka, CDU

S
Krista Sager, Bündnis 90/Die Grünen
Anton Schaaf, SPD
Anita Schäfer, CDU
Axel Schäfer, SPD
Paul Schäfer, Die Linke.
Frank Schäffler, FDP
Wolfgang Schäuble, CDU
Hermann Josef Scharf, CDU
Elisabethe Scharfenberg, Bündnis 90/Die Grünen
Hartmut Schauerte, CDU
Annette Schavan, CDU
Christine Scheel, Bündnis 90/Die Grünen
Bernd Scheelen, SPD
Hermann Scheer, SPD
Andreas Scheuer, CSU
Irmingard Schewe-Gerigk, Bündnis 90/Die Grünen
Gerhard Schick, Bündnis 90/Die Grünen
Marianne Schieder, SPD
Karl Richard Maria Schiewerling, CDU
Konrad Schily, FDP
Otto Schily, SPD
Norbert Schindler, CDU
Georg Schirmbeck, CDU
Bernd Schmidbauer, CDU
Andreas Schmidt, CDU
Christian Schmidt, CSU
Frank Schmidt, SPD
Renate Schmidt, SPD
Silvia Schmidt, SPD
Ulla Schmidt, SPD
Heinz Schmitt, SPD
Ingo Schmitt, CDU
Carsten Schneider, SPD
Volker Schneider, Die Linke.
Andreas Schockenhoff, CDU
Olaf Scholz, SPD
Ottmar Schreiner, SPD
Ole Schröder, CDU
Herbert Schui, Die Linke.
Bernhard Schulte-Drüggelte, CDU
Reinhard Walter Schultz, SPD
Swen Schulz, SPD
Uwe Schummer, CDU
Ewald Schurer, SPD
Marina Schuster, FDP
Frank Schwabe, SPD
Angelica Schwall-Düren, SPD
Martin Schwanholz, SPD
Rolf Schwanitz, SPD
Rita Schwarzelühr-Sutter, SPD
Wilhelm Josef Sebastian, CDU
Horst Seehofer, CSU
Kurt Segner, CDU
Ilja Seifert, Die Linke.
Bernd Siebert, CDU
Thomas Silberhorn, CSU
Johannes Singhammer, CSU
Petra Sitte, Die Linke.
Hermann Otto Solms, FDP
Jens Spahn, CDU
Wolfgang Spanier, SPD
Margrit Spielmann, SPD
Frank Spieth, Die Linke.
Jörg-Otto Spiller, SPD
Max Josef Stadler, FDP
Ditmar Staffelt, SPD
Grietje Staffelt, Bündnis 90/Die Grünen
Rainder Steenblock, Bündnis 90/Die Grünen
Erika Steinbach, CDU
Andreas Steppuhn, SPD
Christian von Stetten, CDU
Ludwig Stiegler, SPD
Rainer Stinner, FDP
Rolf Stöckel, SPD
Silke Stokar von Neuforn, Bündnis 90/Die Grünen
Gero Storjohann, CDU
Andreas Storm, CDU
Christoph Strässer, SPD
Max Straubinger, CSU
Thomas Strobl, CDU
Hans-Christian Ströbele, Bündnis 90/Die Grünen
Lena Strothmann, CDU
Peter Struck, SPD
Michael Stübgen, CDU
Joachim Stünker, SPD

T
Rainer Tabillion, SPD
Kirsten Tackmann, Die Linke.
Jörg Tauss, Pirate Party (not a parliamentary group)
Frank Tempel, Die Linke.
Harald Terpe, Bündnis 90/Die Grünen
Jella Teuchner, SPD
Carl-Ludwig Thiele, FDP
Wolfgang Thierse, SPD
Jörn Thießen, SPD
Franz Thönnes, SPD
Antje Tillmann, CDU
Florian Toncar, FDP
Jürgen Trittin, Bündnis 90/Die Grünen
Axel Troost, Die Linke.

U
Hans-Jürgen Uhl, SPD
Hans-Peter Uhl, CSU
Alexander Ulrich, Die Linke

V
Arnold Vaatz, CDU
Rüdiger Veit, SPD
Simone Violka, SPD
Andrea Astrid Voßhoff, CDU
Volkmar Uwe Vogel, CDU
Jörg Willi Vogelsänger, SPD
Marlies Eva Volkmer, SPD

W
Gerhard Wächter, CDU
Christoph Waitz, FDP
Marco Wanderwitz, CDU
Hedi Wegener, SPD
Kai Wegner, CDU
Andreas Weigel, SPD
Marcus Weinberg, CDU
Petra Weis, SPD
Gerald Weiß, CDU
Peter Weiß, CDU
Gunter Weißgerber, SPD
Gert Weisskirchen, SPD
Ingo Wellenreuther, CDU
Karl-Georg Wellmann, CDU
Rainer Wend, SPD
Guido Westerwelle, FDP
Lydia Westrich, SPD
Margrit Wetzel, SPD
Andrea Wicklein, SPD
Annette Widmann-Mauz, CDU
Heidemarie Wieczorek-Zeul, SPD
Dieter Wiefelspütz, SPD
Wolfgang Wieland, Bündnis 90/Die Grünen
Klaus-Peter Willsch, CDU
Willy Wimmer, CDU
Elisabeth Winkelmeier-Becker, CDU
Gert Winkelmeier, Die Linke.
Josef Philip Winkler, Bündnis 90/Die Grünen
Claudia Winterstein, FDP
Volker Wissing, FDP
Engelbert Wistuba, SPD
Wolfgang Wodarg, SPD
Dagmar Wöhrl, CSU
Margareta Wolf, Bündnis 90/Die Grünen
Hartfrid Wolff, FDP
Waltraud Wolff, SPD
Heidemarie Wright, SPD
Jörn Wunderlich, Die Linke.

Z
Uta Zapf, SPD
Martin Zeil, FDP
Sabine Zimmermann, Die Linke.
Wolfgang Zöller, CSU
Manfred Helmut Zöllmer, SPD
Willi Zylajew, CDU
Brigitte Zypries, SPD

Changes of membership after the election of 18 September 2005

Changes of caucus after the election of 18 September 2005

See also 
 Politics of Germany
 List of Bundestag Members

External links 
 Members of the 16th Bundestag (in German)
 2005 federal election results (in German)

16